Psalm 11 is the eleventh psalm of the Book of Psalms, beginning in English in the King James Version: "In the LORD put I my trust: how say ye to my soul, Flee as a bird to your mountain?" In the Greek Septuagint and the Latin Vulgate, it is psalm 10, in a slightly different numbering, "In Domino confido". Its authorship is traditionally assigned to King David, but most scholars place its origin some time after the end of the Babylonian captivity.

The psalm forms a regular part of Jewish, Catholic, Lutheran, Anglican and other Protestant liturgies. It was set to music by composers including Heinrich Schütz, Joseph Stephenson and Benjamin Cooke.

Text

Hebrew Bible version 
The following is the Hebrew text of Psalm 11:

King James Version 
 In the LORD put I my trust: how say ye to my soul, Flee as a bird to your mountain?
 For, lo, the wicked bend their bow, they make ready their arrow upon the string, that they may privily shoot at the upright in heart.
 If the foundations be destroyed, what can the righteous do?
 The LORD is in his holy temple, the LORD's throne is in heaven: his eyes behold, his eyelids try, the children of men.
 The LORD trieth the righteous: but the wicked and him that loveth violence his soul hateth.
 Upon the wicked he shall rain snares, fire and brimstone, and an horrible tempest: this shall be the portion of their cup.
 For the righteous LORD loveth righteousness; his countenance doth behold the upright.

Structure
The shape of this psalm differs from the usual scheme, for which the Old Testament scholar Hermann Gunkel finally assigns as a "confidence Psalm in the form of conversation". Erhard S. Gerstenberger calls the psalm a "disputierendes prayer" within the genus of Lamentations of an individual.  has the psalm as a song of prayer.

Usually, the Psalm is organized as follows:
 Verse 1a: trust in YHWH 
 Verse 1b-3: Rejecting the advice of well-meaning friends 
 Verse 4-7: YHWH as fair judge and legal helpers of the persecuted
A division into verses is sometimes not done.

Interpretation
The psalm is strongly individual.  calls this the personal testimony of persecution, who have opted for the legal process. Hermann Gunkel agrees calling it the "subjective response of a single poet to an involuntary emergency".  sees the psalm as "a product of post-exil scriptural scholarship that seeks to modernise traditional text" "ein Produkt nachexilischer Schriftgelehrsamkeit, die die Texte der Tradition modernisieren will").

The psalm leads off with a question which is put to the writer's soul: 'Why should I flee like a bird to the mountains?' Barnes and many others see the fleeing as negative and running away rather than trusting God. The Psalmist instead resolves to trust God. There is an irony in that David often did flee from Saul to the mountains, but in the long run became King in Jerusalem in 1 Sam chapters 21 through 23. Additionally there is a contrast with Psalm 7:  the wicked shoot arrows at the righteous in Psalm 11, but in Psalm 7 God readied his bow and arrows for the wicked. There is also a tension: God is felt to be far away and unresponsive  - but He is not and that tension also appears in other Psalms, such as in Psalm 22.

Uses

Catholicism
According to the Rule of St. Benedict (530AD), Psalm 1 to Psalm 20 were mainly reserved for Office of Prime. This psalm was traditionally performed at the Office of Prime on Wednesday.

In the current liturgy, Psalm 11 is, most solemnly recited or sung during vespers on Monday of the first week.

Music
Heinrich Schütz set a metred hymn paraphrasing Psalm 11 in German, "Ich trau auf Gott, was soll's denn sein", SWV 107, included in the Becker Psalter. Joseph Stephenson included a paraphrase in English, "Since I have plac'd my trust in God", in his 1757 collection Church Harmony, Sacred to Devotion. Benjamin Cooke wrote a setting of a metred paraphrase in English of verses 1–3, "On God My Steadfast Hopes Rely", published in 1794.

References

External links 

 
 
  in Hebrew and English - Mechon-mamre
 Text of Psalm 11 according to the 1928 Psalter
 For the leader. Of David. / In the LORD I take refuge text and footnotes, usccb.org United States Conference of Catholic Bishops
 Psalm 11:1 introduction and text, biblestudytools.com
 Psalm 11 – The Answer of Faith to the Advice of Fear enduringword.com
 Psalm 11 / Refrain: The Lord’s throne is in heaven. Church of England
 Psalm 11 at biblegateway.com
 Hymns for Psalm 11 hymnary.org

011
Works attributed to David